Oseam refers to;

Oseam, a Korean Buddhist temple
Oseam (2003 film), a 2003 South Korean film
Oseam (1990 film), a 1990 South Korean film